Darius Žutautas (born 30 September 1978) is a Lithuanian former professional footballer.

Career
Žutautas is an active member of the Lithuanian national team. He has previously played for Banga Gargždai, Žalgiris Vilnius, FK Panerys Vilnius, Swit Nowy Dwor, Dinamo Moscow, Kaunas before leaving for Russia in 2005 and joining Alania Vladikavkaz. After the club was relegated to a lower league, Žutautas returned to Lithuania and signed a contract with Atlantas Klaipėda until July 2006. Later, after having an unsuccessful short spell at Tavriya Simferopol, he resigned with Atlantas until the end of the season. In 2010 the defender played for Platanias F.C. in Greek Gamma Ethniki (Third Division).

He joined Bergsøy IL in 2011, a Norwegian third division team.

Coaching
He also trains Bergsøy G16, which he really enjoys.

Personal life
His older brother Giedrius Žutautas was also a professional footballer.

References

External links
 
 

1978 births
Living people
Lithuanian footballers
Lithuanian expatriate footballers
Lithuania international footballers
FC Dynamo Moscow players
FK Panerys Vilnius players
FC Spartak Vladikavkaz players
Expatriate footballers in Azerbaijan
Expatriate footballers in Russia
Russian Premier League players
Khazar Lankaran FK players
People from Gargždai
Association football defenders